The Global Alliance for Genomics and Health (GA4GH) is an international consortium that is developing standards for responsibly collecting, storing, analyzing, and sharing genomic data in order to enable an "internet of genomics". GA4GH was founded in 2013.

GA4GH is founded on the Framework for the Responsible Sharing of Genomic and Health-related Data, which is based on the human right to benefit from scientific advances.

Organization 
GA4GH maintained by four Host Institutions (Wellcome Sanger Institute, Broad Institute, Ontario Institute for Cancer Research and the European Bioinformatics Institute). Ewan Birney is the current GA4GH chair and Peter Goodhand is the Chief Executive Officer. Heidi Rehm and Kathryn North are the current Vice Chairs.

Organizational members of the alliance include:

Funding 
GA4GH is supported by a "Funder's Forum" composed of organizations whose funding commitments exceed USD $200,000 annually, for at least three years. Forum members include:

 Canadian Institutes of Health Research
 Genome Canada
 National Institute for Health Research
 National Institutes of Health
 National Cancer Institute
 National Heart, Lung and Blood Institute
 National Human Genome Research Institute
 Office of Data Science Strategy
 Office of the Director of the National Institutes of Health / All of Us research project
 UK Research and Innovation
 Medical Research Council
 Wellcome Trust

Activities 
All GA4GH standards are developed by six technical and two foundational "Work Streams" in collaboration with real-world genomic data initiatives called "Driver Projects."

GA4GH Work Streams 
 Regulatory and Ethics (foundational)  
 Data Security (foundational)  
 Cloud  
 Clinical & Phenotypic Data Capture   
 Data Use and Researcher Identities  
 Discovery  
 Genomic Knowledge Standards  
 Large Scale Genomics

GA4GH Driver Projects 
 All of US Research Program
 Australian Genomics
 BRCA Challenge
 Canadian Distributed Infrastructure for Genomics (CanDig)
 Clinical Genome Resource (ClinGen)
 ELIXIR Beacon
 The European Nucleotide Archive, European Variation Archive, and European Genome-phenome Archive at EMBL-EBI
 EUCANCan 
 European Joint Programme on Rare Diseases 
 Genomics England
 Human Cell Atlas
 Human Heredity and Health in Africa (H3Africa) 
 International Cancer Genome Consortium - ARGO
 Matchmaker Exchange
 The Monarch Initiative
 National Cancer Institute Data Commons Framework (NCI DCF) and Genomic Data Commons (NCI GDC)
 Trans-Omics for Precision Medicine (TOPMed)
 Variant Interpretation for Cancer Consortium (VICC)

References 

Genetics in the United Kingdom
Genomics organizations
South Cambridgeshire District